Frederic Morton (October 5, 1924 – April 20, 2015) was an Austrian-born American writer.

Life 
Born Fritz Mandelbaum in Vienna, Morton was the son of a blacksmith who specialized in forging (manufacturing) imperial medals. In the wake of the Anschluss of 1938, his father was arrested, but later released. The family fled to Britain in 1939 and migrated to New York City the next year, when the senior Mandelbaum also changed the family name in order to be able to join an anti-Semitic labor union.

Morton worked as a baker but began studying literature in 1949. He returned to Austria  in 1962 to marry his fiancée, Marcia, whom he had met at college.

From 1959, Morton worked as a columnist for several American periodicals including The New York Times, Esquire, and Playboy. He died at the Hilton hotel in Vienna at the age of 90 on April 20, 2015.

Selected works
The Hound (Dodd, Mead, 1947) Intercollegiate Literary Fellowship Prize Novels
Asphalt and Desire (Harcourt Brace, 1952) novel
The Witching Ship (Random House, 1960) novel
The Rothschilds: A Family Portrait (Atheneum Books, 1962) ; edition with new epilogue and afterword, The Rothschilds: Portrait of a Dynasty (New York: Kodansha International, 1998), 
The Schatten Affair (Atheneum, 1965) novel
Snow Gods (New American Library, 1968) novel
An Unknown Woman (Little Brown, 1976) novel
A Nervous Splendor: Vienna, 1888–1889 (Little Brown, 1979) reprinted by the Folio Society 2006
The Forever Street (Doubleday, 1984)  novel
Chocolate: An Illustrated History (Random House, 1986)  written with his wife Marcia
Crosstown Sabbath: A Street Journey Through History (Grove Press, 1987) 
Thunder at Twilight: Vienna 1913-1914 (Scribner's, 1989)
Runaway Waltz (Simon & Schuster, 2005)  memoir

Decorations and awards
 1963: Author of the Year (Anti-Defamation League)
 1980: Title of "Professor"
 2001: Gold Medal of Vienna
 2003: Austrian Cross of Honour for Science and Art, 1st class

References

External links
 Complete bibliography (Literaturhaus Wien)
 New York Times | The Memories of a Jew, Now Honored by Vienna (By Richard Bernstein, June 28, 2003)
 L.A. Times | On Thelemanngasse (By Frederic Morton, February 20, 2006)
 

1924 births
2015 deaths
Jewish emigrants from Austria to the United States after the Anschluss
American bakers
Jewish American novelists
People from Hernals
Recipients of the Austrian Cross of Honour for Science and Art, 1st class
American columnists
The New York Times columnists
20th-century American novelists
21st-century American non-fiction writers
Writers from Vienna
American male novelists
20th-century American male writers
20th-century American non-fiction writers
American male non-fiction writers
21st-century American male writers
21st-century American Jews